Yasin El Harrouk, known artistically as YONII, is a German actor and rapper of Moroccan origin. He sings in both German and Moroccan Arabic.

Biography 
Yasin El Harouk was born in 1991 in Germany to a family of Moroccan guest workers from Berkane, and grew up with six siblings in Stuttgart-Feuerbach. After graduating high school, he lived in Morocco for four years before returning to Stuttgart, where he studied acting at the Stuttgart University of Music and Performing Arts. He became known in Germany after a friend posted a 4-minute freestyle of his on YouTube. The video amassed millions of views. YONII then decided to launch his musical career by releasing his first single entitled Ghetto. This single was part of his first EP project entitled 'Entre 2 Mondes which was released in 2017.

In 2018, he collaborated with Ismo, Riffi, Biwai and Mr. Crazy on the official song of the Moroccan team for the 2018 World Cup.

Discography

Studio albums 

 2017 : Entre 2 Mondes
 2019 : Emeute

Singles 

 2016 : Ghetto
 2017 : Mama
 2017 : Ziel halal
 2017 : Anonym
 2018 : Lampedusa
 2018 : Welt sehen
 2018 : Direction
 2018 : Leinwand
 2019 : Cabaret
 2019 : Randale
 2019 : Habibti
 2019 : Martinique
 2020 : Fugazi (feat. Farid Bang)

Collaborations 

 2018 : Mabrouk 3lina by Ismo ft YONII
 2018 : DEJA VU by Mike Singer ft YONII
 2018 : Zu Spät by Mudi ft YONII
 2020 : Sans Papiers by Max Herre ft YONII

Filmography  

 2014 : Tatort - Der Wüstensohn
 2017 : Die Herberge
 2017 : Helen Dorn- Verlorene Mädchen
 2017 : Tatort - Am End geht man nackt
 2017 : Alerte Cobra
 2017 : Stralsund: Kein Weg zurück
 2018 : Herrliche Zeiten

TV 

 2018 : Dogs of Berlin

References 

German actors
German rappers
21st-century German male singers
Musicians from Stuttgart
1991 births
Living people
German people of Moroccan descent